JAligner is an open source Java implementation of the Smith-Waterman algorithm with Gotoh's improvement for biological local pairwise sequence alignment using the affine gap penalty model. It was written by Ahmed Moustafa.

See also 
 Sequence alignment software
 Clustal

References

External links 
 Official website

Phylogenetics software